The Mooretown Rancheria of Maidu Indians of California is a federally recognized tribe of Concow and Maidu people in Butte County. Concow, or Konkow, people are the northwestern or foothill branch of the Maidu people, who traditionally spoke the Concow language

Government
Mooretown Rancheria is headquartered in Oroville, California. The tribe is governed by a democratically elected, tribal council, and the current tribal chairperson is Ben Clark.

History

https://mooretowndistributees.com/, Original Mooretown Distributees. All records are from BIA FOIA request.

Education
The ranchería is served by the Palermo Union Elementary School District and Oroville Union High School District.

Reservation
The Mooretown Rancheria is a federally recognized ranchería with an area of 109 acres. It is located in the community of Oroville East, in suburban Oroville. Other nearby communities include South Oroville and Palermo.

Economic development
The tribe owns and operates the Feather Falls Casino, Feather Falls Casino Brewing Company, The Lodge at Feather Falls Casino, KOA Kampground, Feather Falls Mini Mart, and the Feather Smoke Shop, all located in Oroville.

See also
Indigenous peoples of California

Notes

References
 Pritzker, Barry M. A Native American Encyclopedia: History, Culture, and Peoples. Oxford: Oxford University Press, 2000.

External links
 Mooretown Rancheria of Maidu Indians of California, official website
 Tribal History, Feather Falls

Maidu
Federally recognized tribes in the United States
Native American tribes in California